Triadimefon is a fungicide used in agriculture to control various fungal diseases.  As a seed treatment, it is used on barley, corn, cotton, oats, rye, sorghum, and wheat.  In fruit it is used on pineapple and banana.  Non-food uses include pine seedlings, Christmas trees, turf, ornamental plants, and landscaping.

References

Aromatase inhibitors
Fungicides
Triazoles
Chloroarenes